Fictional shared universes in film and television.

Film
This is a list of shared universes in film. There are different definitions of shared universe. It is a requirement that two or more previously unconnected characters come together into one film.

Common origin 
Some definitions of a shared universe allow a single original work if later works can be split into loosely connected groups with different characters, sometimes sharing an overall continuity.

Television

This is a partial list of fictional universes created for television.

Shared media

This is a partial list of fictional universes created for both television and cinema.

This is a list of shared universes in media covering Films, Television Series, etc. There are different definitions of shared universe. It is a requirement that a character from one media appears in another, to connect the universe (unless stated by developers).

See also
 List of highest-grossing media franchises

References

Lists of films and television series